A personal stylist  advises individuals on new fashion trends, clothing styles, personal styles, colours and make-up. A personal stylist is not to be confused with a wardrobe stylist, who selects the clothing for published editorial features, print or television advertising campaigns, music videos, concert performances, and  public appearances made by celebrities and models. Personal stylists typically work one-on-one with the client, while Wardrobe Stylists are often part of a larger creative team  collaborating with a fashion designer, photographer, art director, hair stylist, and makeup artist to put together a particular look or theme for the specific project.

Personal styling
A personal stylist is concerned with an individual rather than a particular fashion brand. 

With the recent rise of fame for celebrity stylists, like Rachel Zoe, Trinny and Susannah, and Gok Wan, and of the glut of reality television shows featuring makeovers and the day-to-day lives of personal stylists (e.g., The Rachel Zoe Project), the general public have heightened their interest and awareness in understanding the theory behind achieving styles that suit them. Personal stylists are now addressing this demand and serving the general public who view the service as a luxury but a beneficial experience. 

There are numerous personal stylists worldwide, and the numbers are growing steadily. A reputable personal stylist will be affiliated with an accredited industry body, such as the Federation of Image Professionals International (FIPI), which sets the industry standards in line with City and Guilds and is  based in the UK. Training is offered by a number of image schools and can take up to an intense month to complete. 

The United Kingdom has a growing industry of personal stylists, who offer style and fashion tips and image consultancy for corporate customers. The vast range of designer and Highstreet stores in London makes it a haven for personal stylists, and so London, in particular, is at the heart of the fashion community, with some saying that London has become the fashion capital of the World.

References

Fashion occupations
Fashion stylists
Personal care and service occupations